Elmira is an unincorporated community in Milford Township, LaGrange County, Indiana.

It was likely named after Elmira, New York.

Geography

References

Unincorporated communities in LaGrange County, Indiana
Unincorporated communities in Indiana